Castle Gate is a hamlet in west Cornwall, England, United Kingdom.

References

Hamlets in Cornwall